Seymour Gates Pond (1896–1976) was an American adventurer and writer. He was navigating officer on the USS Savannah (AS-8) during the First World War and later an officer in the British Royal Flying Corps. 

He traveled in South America in 1928. He led two scientific expeditions to South America. He also traveled in North Africa, with the French and Spanish legions.

Writing

He wrote at least fifty short stories for pulp magazines such as Air Trails.

Non-fiction

He also wrote non-fiction, mostly biographies.

 The History and Romance of Exploration Told with Pictures
 True Adventures of Pirates
 Ferdinand Magellan: Master Mariner
 African Explorer: The Adventures of Carl Akeley

References

Pulp fiction writers
1896 births
1976 deaths
American expatriates in the United Kingdom